Eles (also transliterated as Ellès and Al Las) is a village in the Siliana Governorate, Tunisia. It is located around   about 13 km northwest of Maktar. in Siliana Governorate.

Eles, Tunisia sits over a natural spring at the base of the surrounding hills.

The village is notable for the large number of dolmens found immediately to the west, thought to be from around 2500 BC.  BC. south and east of the village which are typical of the tombs found around Maktar. A study of fifty-three of the dolmens by Belmonte, Esteban and Jiménez González suggest that some of these tombs may be orientated towards Alpha Centauri. In contrast Hoskin argues that Tunisian dolmen orientations can be explained by the local topography, in that the entrances all face downhill.

The local rock strata are geologically interesting as they provide a particularly good record of the Cretaceous–Paleogene boundary, which is now better known as the Cretaceous–Paleogene extinction event.

During the Roman Empire and late antiquity there was a civitas (Roman town) called Ululi.

Notes

References
 
 
 
 

Archaeoastronomy
Populated places in Tunisia
Archaeological sites in Tunisia
Ancient Berber cities
Roman towns and cities in Tunisia
Catholic titular sees in Africa